Connecticut's 9th State Senate district elects one member to the Connecticut State Senate. It consists of the towns of Cromwell, Newington, Rocky Hill, and parts of Middletown and Wethersfield. The district is currently represented by Democrat Matt Lesser, who has served since 2019.

Recent elections

2020

2018

2016

2014

2012

References

09